Ketner is a surname. Notable people with the surname include:

Kenneth Laine Ketner, American philosopher
Lari Ketner (1977–2014), American basketball player
Nikolas Ketner (born 1991), Czech ice hockey defenceman
Ralph Ketner (1920–2016), American businessman and philanthropist